The 55th Venice Biennale was an international contemporary art exhibition held in 2013. The Venice Biennale takes place biennially in Venice, Italy. Artistic director Massimiliano Gioni curated its central exhibition, "The Encyclopedic Palace".

Awards 

 Golden Lion for best artist of the exhibition: Tino Sehgal
 Silver Lion for the most promising young artist of main exhibition: Camille Henrot
 Golden Lions for lifetime achievement: Marisa Merz and Maria Lassnig
 Golden Lion for best national participation: Angolan pavilion

Reception 

ARTnews later named the Biennale among the decade's best shows and praised, in particular, Gioni's central exhibition for displaying self-taught artists alongside major artists.

References

Further reading

External links 

 

2013 in art
2013 in Italy
Venice Biennale exhibitions